The Quartette Trés Bien was an American jazz combo based in St. Louis led by pianist Jeter Thompson. The group started to play around 1960 and began recording in the mid '60s.

Members
Jeter Thompson played with Jimmy Forrest, Oliver Nelson and Emmett Carter in his early years. The bassist of the group is Richard Simmons, the drummer Albert St. James who accompanied also Charlie Parker, Tab Smith and Jimmy Forrest. Percussionist Percy James added a Latin flavor to the quartette who played more than ten years, before splitting. Jeter Thompson is still active leading for a few years the Trio Tres Bien with brothers Harold Thompson (bass) and Howard Thompson (drums).

Discography 

Quartette Trés Bien (1962) Norman Records 
Kilimanjaro (1963) Norman Records  / (1964) Decca 
Boss Trés Bien (1964) Decca 
Spring Into Spring (1965) Decca 
Stepping Out! (1965) Decca 
Sky High (1966) Decca 
Bully! (1966) Atlantic 
In Motion (1966) Decca 
Where It's At! (1967) Decca 
Here It Is! (1967) Decca 
Four of a Kind (1968) Decca 
Our Thing (1968) Decca 
Coming Together (2004) as The Trio Tres Bien

References 

The Decca Labels - A discography (Michel Ruppli)

External links 
 Quartette Tres Bien recordings at the Discography of American Historical Recordings.
TOM LORD'S JAZZ DISCOGRAPHY
TRIO TRES BIEN

American jazz ensembles from Missouri
Musical groups established in 1960
1960 establishments in Missouri